Cystopteris laurentiana, commonly called Laurentian bladderfern or St. Lawrence bladderfern, is a species of fern in the family Cystopteridaceae. It is native to eastern North America, primarily in the Great Lakes-St. Lawrence lowlands, but there are also scattered occurrences in New England and Atlantic Canada. It grows on cliffs composed of calcareous rocks, such as limestone, dolostone and diabase.

Taxonomy 
Cystopteris laurentiana is a fertile allohexaploid hybrid between C. bulbifera (bulblet fern) and C. fragilis (fragile fern).  The scientific name is therefore sometimes written as C. × laurentiana, which denotes hybrid origin.

References 

Ferns of Canada
Ferns of the United States
Ferns of the Americas
laurentiana